This is a list of electoral results for the electoral district of Black in South Australian state elections from the district's first election in 2018 until the present.

Members for Black

Election results

Elections in the 2020s

Elections in the 2010s

References

South Australian state electoral results by district